Filled pasta or stuffed pasta refers to a dumpling with a flour, especially pasta, wrapper or skin, usually sealed, surrounding a variety of fillings.  Such pasta is especially common in non-tropical regions of Eurasia.  Examples of filled pasta include jiaozi, mantı, pierogies, ravioli and tortellini.

The pasta wrappers are usually fresh pasta, but dried pasta can be used if the dumpling is not sealed.  Premade filled pasta for mass consumption is often pasteurized to set the dough structure.

While most filled pastas are sealed on all sides, rotolo ripieno is rolled, but not sealed, and guotie (potstickers) are often unsealed at either end.  Similar types of pasta include layered pasta such as lasagna, while similar stuffed preparations include kachoris, samosas and tamales.

See also
List of dumplings
List of stuffed dishes

List of pasta dishes
List of Italian pasta varieties

References

 
Dumplings